The 2015 BBC Sports Personality of the Year Award took place on 20 December 2015 at the Odyssey Arena in Belfast. It was the 62nd presentation of the BBC Sports Personality of the Year Award. Awarded annually by the British Broadcasting Corporation (BBC), the main award honours an individual's British sporting achievement over the past year, with the winner selected by public vote from a twelve-person shortlist.

In addition to the main award, there were seven other awards: Team of the Year, Coach of the Year, Overseas Sports Personality of the Year, Young Sports Personality of the Year, Helen Rollason Award, Lifetime Achievement Award and Unsung Hero.

Controversy 
There were calls to remove Tyson Fury from the nominees list, after comments he made were criticised as homophobic and sexist.

Nominees
The nominees were revealed on 30 November 2015.

Other awards
In addition to the main award as "Sports Personality of the Year", several other awards were also announced:

Overseas Personality: Dan Carter
Team of the Year: Great Britain Davis Cup team
Lifetime Achievement: AP McCoy
Coach of the Year: Michael O'Neill
Helen Rollason Award: Bailey Matthews
Young Personality: Ellie Downie
Unsung Hero Award: Damien Lindsay

In Memoriam

Howard Kendall
Jerry Collins Jonah Lomu
Jules Bianchi Justin Wilson
Doris Hart Rosalind Rowe
Bob Appleyard Clive Rice
Billy Casper Calvin Peete
Chris Leatherbarrow Derek Turner
Bobby Campbell Dave Mackay
Brian Close
Daniel Topolski
Ken Graveney Tom Graveney
Florence Arthaud Camille Muffat Alexis Vastine
Alan Hodgkinson Ron Springett
Geoff Duke Dr John Hinds
Bob Braithwaite Peter Heatly
Louis Martin Richard Meade
Richie Benaud
Peter O'Sullevan
Yogi Berra Ron Clarke
Eileen Gray Louise Suggs
Ernie Lewis Jim Meadowcroft
Alan Lee Aaron Devlin
Gerry Byrne Brian Hall
Marton Fulop
Pat Eddery
Geoff Pullar Frank Tyson
Ayo Falola Sean Kyle
Raymond Mould Andy King
Philip Carter Jack Hayward
Arthur Dorward Jim McCarthy
Alan Woodward Ralph Milne
Kirsty Howard Margaret Simons
Peter Dimmock
Danny Jones

References

External links
Official website

BBC Sports Personality of the Year awards
BBC Sports Personality of the Year
BBC Sports Personality of the Year
Bbc
Bbc
BBC Sports Personality of the Year